Body Melt is a 1993 Australian independent science fiction black comedy body horror film directed by Philip Brophy and written by Brophy and Rod Bishop. Brophy and Bishop are ex-members of the art punk group → ↑ →. The pair also composed the film's soundtrack.

Plot
The residents of Pebbles Court in the suburb of Homesville in Melbourne are the unknowing test subjects for a new variety of "Vimuville" dietary supplement pills that arrive for free in their mailboxes. The pills are designed to produce the ultimate healthy human, but have unexpected side effects including hallucinations and mutations. Despite the attempts made to warn the townsfolk from a previous test subject, who is now undergoing rapid cellular decay, he arrives too late, and crashes his car and is killed by tentacles growing out of his throat. The pills are consumed by the residents, and produce liquefying flesh, elongated tongues, exploding stomachs, exploding penises, imploding heads, monstrous births, tentacles growing out of the face, living mucus, sentient placentas, and other gruesome mutations. Ultimately more and more of the residents of the Pebbles Court mutate or die horrific deaths, until almost every character has been dispatched.

Cast
 Gerard Kennedy as Det. Samuel Phillips
 Andrew Daddo as Johnno
 Ian Smith as Dr. Carrera
 Regina Gaigalas as Shaan
 Vincent Gil as Pud
 Neil Foley as Bab
 Anthea Davis as Slab
 Matthew Newton as Bronto
 Lesley Baker as Mack
 Amy Grove-Rogers as Old Woman
 Adrian Wright as Thompson Noble
 Jillian Murray as Angelica Noble
 Ben Geurens as Brandon Noble
 Amanda Douge as Elloise Noble
 Brett Climo as Brian Rand
 Lisa McCune as Cheryl Rand
 Nick Polites as Sal Ciccone
 Maurie Annese as Gino Argento
 William McInnes as Paul Matthews
 Suzi Dougherty as Kate
 Bill Young as Willie

Production
The film was shot in October and November 1992.

Critical reception 

Video review wrote "With over 150 ways to melt your body, it's one of the most innovative and versatile horror films ever. Guaranteed to make you squirm."
Samhain wrote "Unique and individual. A wicked and gruesome satire on the clean-living lifestyle of modern Australia as seen across the globe in various TV soaps."
Screen International described the film "As satirical as it is sick-making. A cult hit."
Star Burst wrote "Packs more mucous, phlegm, puke, snot, slime & spit than you'd ever think possible."
Time Out wrote "Despite its emetic preoccupation with exploding stomachs & bodily fluids there is also a liberal injection of black humour."
Fangoria wrote "A slime-soaked all-out shocker!"
Face described the film as "A dumb/smart satire on health fascism. The kind of movie they just don't make anymore."
According to Bloody Disgusting Magazine: «The film is a satire of extremely healthy living»
 PopHorror: "Residents of peaceful Pebbles Court, Homesville, are being used unknowingly as test experiments for a new Body Drug that causes rapid body decomposition (melting skin etc.) and painful death."
 SBS Moves: "A yucky, shlocky, gory, tongue-in-cheek horror film".

Accolades

Home media
Body Melt was released on DVD with a new print by Umbrella Entertainment in August 2006. The DVD is compatible with all region codes and includes special features such as the original theatrical trailer, Umbrella Entertainment trailers, a behind the scenes featurette with cast and crew and a storyboard gallery.

On 25 September 2018, the film was released on DVD and Blu-ray by Vinegar Syndrome.

See also
Cinema of Australia

References

External links 
 
 
Body Melt at Oz Movies
 Body Melt at the National Film and Sound Archive

1993 films
1990s science fiction horror films
Australian satirical films
1990s English-language films
1993 horror films
Films set in Melbourne
Films shot in Melbourne
Australian splatter films
Australian comedy horror films
Australian science fiction comedy films
Biopunk films
Body horror films
Mad scientist films
Australian science fiction horror films